The relations between the United Kingdom and Oman are strong and strategic.

The United Kingdom has an embassy in Muscat and Oman has an embassy in London.

Military relations

The UK and Oman have close military ties. As part of this relationship the UK and Oman have held three large-scale joint exercises called Saif Sareea or "Swift Sword", the first of these being held in 1986.  Saif Sareea II in 2001 was the largest deployment of UK forces since the Suez Crisis. Saif Sareea 3, held in 2018, was the largest exercise held by the two countries in terms of total personnel.

In April 2010 the government of Oman stated that it wanted to buy Eurofighter Typhoons from the UK. BAE Systems and Oman signed an agreement in December 2012, valued at £2.5 billion, for the delivery of 12 Eurofighter Typhoon jets along with 8 BAE Systems Hawk training jets. Oman is the only foreign export customer of the Challenger 2, Britain's main battle tank.

In 2022, Oman and the United Kingdom signed the Executive Order of the Mutual Defence Agreement, in order to cooperate in a number of fields, including the military.

Royal visits

Queen Elizabeth II visited Oman in November 2010 to commemorate Oman's 40th National Day and take part in the celebrations of the Country. This was her second visit to the Sultanate (the first being in 1979).

See also
 Foreign relations of Oman
 Foreign relations of the United Kingdom

References

External links
Message of condolence from The Queen on the passing of Sultan Qaboos bin Said al Said

 
Bilateral relations of the United Kingdom
United Kingdom